webMethods Glue is an enterprise web services platform from webMethods. It provides web services/SOAP capabilities to existing Java and C/C++ applications.

Developers use the Java-based product to add enterprise web services integration to legacy applications with reduced programming effort. It is an embeddable product (small footprint) that turns a non-web service application into one that exposes its functionality as a web services.
Similar to the open source Apache Axis, the Glue product provides a layer of web service interoperability with existing applications.

Product features
webMethods Glue features include:
 Little or no coding to expose application functionality as a web service
 Standalone operation if required (does not need an application server)
 Fast local messaging
 Transparent Java/XML integration
 Web services standards support
 Small memory footprint

Product history
Created by The Mind Electric, GLUE—as it was then named—was the company's flagship product. They released it in two forms: a free, unsupported "standard" version, and a company-supported but commercially licensed "professional" edition.

In September 2003 GLUE featured in a Microsoft Press book, Microsoft .NET and J2EE Interoperability Toolkit.

webMethods acquired the product as part of its merger with The Mind Electric. The merger resulted in rebranding the product with the webMethods prefix to become webMethods Glue.

The webMethods Glue product 6.5.x maintenance ended on May 31, 2010, and support ended a year later.

Release history
 GLUE 3.0 - Aug 2002 
 GLUE 4.0 - April 2003 
 GLUE 4.1 - June 2003

Technologies/standards
HTTP, Servlets, XML, SOAP, WSDL, and UDDI

References

Web services
Service-oriented architecture-related products